Patrick Gibson (born 19 July 1961) is an Irish quizzer. On 24 April 2004 he became the fourth contestant to win the £1m jackpot on the quiz show Who Wants to Be a Millionaire?. He is a multiple world champion in quizzing and one of the world's most successful quiz players. He is best known for winning several quiz shows and being a panellist on Eggheads. He was born, raised and educated in Ireland but currently lives in the United Kingdom and competes as part of the England quiz team. As of 5 December 2018, Gibson is currently the No. 1 ranked quizzer in the world.

Early life and education
Pat was born in Galway in 1961. He moved to Letterkenny, County Donegal in the early 1970s. He was educated at Scoil Colmcille and St Eunan's College in Letterkenny. Pat holds an engineering degree from University College Galway. He emigrated to the United Kingdom in the 1980s, where he trained as a COBOL computer programmer.

TV quiz shows

Who Wants to Be a Millionaire?

On his one million pound question, he still had his 50:50 and phone a friend (he had used the Ask-the-Audience lifeline on the £64,000 question). The question was "Which of these is not one of the American Triple Crown horse races?" Gibson used the 50:50 first, where B. "Belmont Stakes" and D. "Preakness Stakes" disappeared. With A. "Arlington Million" and C. "Kentucky Derby", he then used his phone-a-friend option, phoning Mark Kerr (a highly ranked British quiz player and winner of TV's "Brainiest Estate Agent" title, as well as winner of £250,000 on Who Wants to Be a Millionaire) who said he was 90% sure the answer was Arlington Million, which was Pat's original instinct. Gibson had acted as Kerr's phone-a-friend during his appearance on the show during the same series (15), broadcast weeks before Gibson's success. He correctly answered "Arlington Million" to win £1 million.

Mastermind
In 2005 he was crowned champion of Mastermind: his specialist subjects included Father Ted, the books of Iain M. Banks and the films of Quentin Tarantino.

On 6 August 2010 he was crowned Mastermind Champion of Champions with a winning score of 36 points with no passes. Jesse Honey also scored 36 but had 2 passes.

Brain of Britain
On 25 December 2006 he won the BBC Radio 4 quiz show Brain of Britain, becoming only the fourth person after Roger Pritchard, Kevin Ashman and Chris Hughes to win both that and Mastermind.

In 2008 he finished third in BBC Radio 4's Brain of Brains, behind Egghead Chris Hughes and the eventual winner, 2008 World Quizzing Champion Mark Bytheway.

Eggheads and Are You an Egghead?
Gibson competed in both the first and second series of Are You an Egghead?, a series seeking a new panellist to join the resident team on the BBC Two / 12 Yard quiz show Eggheads. In the first series, he was beaten in the quarter-finals by friend Mark Kerr. He returned for the second series in 2009, and won the final broadcast on 23 November 2009, beating fellow Mastermind and Who Wants to Be a Millionaire? winner David Edwards and thereby claiming a place on the Eggheads team.

National and international quizzing championships

 

 
 
 
 

 

He has amassed 25 international medals (7 gold, 11 silver and 7 bronze), the second highest total ever (behind Kevin Ashman with 27) and is ranked the second strongest player in the World/Europe. In 2007 Gibson won the IQA World Quizzing Championship. In pairs competitions he partners Ian Bayley and they have won the British and European titles.

In 2010 Gibson won the IQA World Quizzing Championship achieving an all-time high score of 180/210, defeating both Kevin Ashman and Belgian Ronny Swiggers who tied at 169/210.  Gibson retained the World Quizzing Championship title in 2011 with a score of 186/210, a 10-point margin over Kevin Ashman, and won again in 2013 with a score of 172/210.

Despite being originally from Ireland, Gibson competes for the England team.

Domestic competition
Pat plays in the Summer in the Orrell and District League for the Millstone team, and in the winter in the Ormskirk league for Collywobblers.

References

External links
World Quizzing Championships 2010
 Interview with Pat Gibson on the Norwegian Quiz Association website.

1963 births
Living people
Alumni of the University of Galway
Contestants on British game shows
IQA team event gold medalists
Irish expatriates in England
People educated at St Eunan's College
People from Letterkenny
People from Galway (city)